The 161st (Huron) Battalion, CEF was a unit in the Canadian Expeditionary Force during the First World War.  Based in London, Ontario, the unit began recruiting in late 1915 in Huron County.  After sailing to England in November 1916, the battalion was absorbed into the 4th Reserve Battalion on February 15, 1918.

The 161st (Huron) Battalion, CEF had two Officer Commanding: Lieut-Col. H. B. Combe (October 30, 1916—May 16, 1917) and Lieut-Col. R. Murdie, DSO (June 28, 1917—February 23, 1918).

The 161st (Huron) Battalion, CEF was perpetuated by The Middlesex and Huron Regiment which was disbanded in 1946.

References

Meek, John F. Over the Top! The Canadian Infantry in the First World War. Orangeville, Ont.: The Author, 1971.

Battalions of the Canadian Expeditionary Force
Military units and formations established in 1915
Military units and formations disestablished in 1918
1915 establishments in Ontario